Ubiquitin specific peptidase 54 is a protein that in humans is encoded by the USP54 gene.

References

Further reading